Kathleen Laskey, sometimes credited as Kathy Laskey, is a Canadian film and television actress. An alumna of The Second City's Toronto troupe, she is most commonly but not exclusively associated with comedic and voice roles. She also voiced Squeak the Mouse on the children's TV show, Peep and the Big Wide World.

She has been married since 1990 to her former Check It Out! castmate Jeff Pustil.

Filmography
SCTV (1982–84): Guest roles
Check It Out! (1985–88): Marlene
Street Legal (1988): Sidney
In Opposition (1989): Karen Collier
Little Rosey (1990): Little Rosey
Edsville (1990): Paula
Getting Gotti (1994): Cassie
Sailor Moon (1995): Berthier/Bertie, Plant Sisters
George Shrinks (2000–03): Perdita Shrinks
Blue Murder (2001–04): Roberta Thorpe
Moville Mysteries (2002–03): Mrs. Kornbuckle/Victor's mother
The Eleventh Hour (2002–05): Joyce Lemsky
My Dad the Rock Star (2003–04): Crystal Zilla
6teen (2004): Yummy Mummy
Carl² (2005–06): Janet Crashman
Totally Spies! (2005–06): Geraldine Husk
Yin Yang Yo! (2006-08): Edna
Wayside (2007–08): Mrs. Jewls
Best Ed (2008-09): Other voices
Being Erica (2009): Barb Strange
The Dating Guy (2009–12): Denise Feltcher
Lost Girl (2012): Tulip
One Starry Christmas (2014): Betsy Jensen
Saving Hope (2015): Betty
The Christmas Cure (2017): Martha Turner
 Big Blue (TV series) (2022): Phil’s Mom

References

External links

Living people
Year of birth missing (living people)
Canadian television actresses
Canadian voice actresses
20th-century Canadian actresses
21st-century Canadian actresses